Félix González may refer to:

Félix González (cyclist) (born 1945), Spanish cyclist
Félix González Canto (born 1968), Mexican politician and economist
Félix González-Torres (1957–1996), American, Cuban-born, gay visual artist
Félix González, politician elected in the 2009 Chilean parliamentary election
Félix González, Argentine boxer who fought Chilean boxer Martín Vargas in 1975